Heinrich Franz Friedrich Tietze (August 31, 1880 – February 17, 1964) was an Austrian mathematician, famous for the Tietze extension theorem on functions from topological spaces to the real numbers.  He also developed the Tietze transformations for group presentations, and was the first to pose the group isomorphism problem. Tietze's graph is also named after him; it describes the boundaries of a subdivision of the Möbius strip into six mutually-adjacent regions, found by Tietze as part of an extension of the four color theorem to non-orientable surfaces.

Education and career
Tietze was the son of Emil Tietze and the grandson of Franz Ritter von Hauer, both of whom were Austrian geologists.
He was born in Schleinz, Austria-Hungary, and studied mathematics at the Technische Hochschule in Vienna beginning in 1898. After additional studies in Munich, he returned to Vienna, completing his doctorate in 1904 and his habilitation in 1908.

From 1910 until 1918 Tietze taught mathematics in Brno, and was promoted to ordinary professor in 1913. He served in the Austrian army during World War I, and then returned to Brno, but in 1919 he took a position at the University of Erlangen, and then in 1925 moved again to the University of Munich, where he remained for the rest of his career.  One of his doctoral students was Georg Aumann. Tietze retired in 1950, and died in Munich, West Germany.

Awards and honors
Tietze was a fellow of the  Bavarian Academy of Sciences and a fellow of the Austrian Academy of Sciences.

Publications
 
 
 
 Über die mit Lineal und Zirkel und die mit dem rechten Zeichenwinkel lösbaren Konstruktionsaufgaben, Mathematische Zeitschrift vol.46, 1940
 mit Leopold Vietoris Beziehungen zwischen den verschiedenen Zweigen der Topologie, Enzyklopädie der Mathematischen Wissenschaften 1929
 Über die Anzahl der stabilen Ruhelagen eines Würfels, Elemente der Mathematik vol.3, 1948
 Über die topologische Invarianten mehrdimensionaler Mannigfaltigkeiten, Monatshefte für Mathematik und Physik, vol. 19, 1908, p.1-118
 Über Simony Knoten und Simony Ketten mit vorgeschriebenen singulären Primzahlen für die Figur und für ihr Spiegelbild, Mathematische Zeitschrift vol.49, 1943, p.351 (Knot theory)

References

External links

Austrian mathematicians
1880 births
1964 deaths
Group theorists
Members of the Austrian Academy of Sciences
Austro-Hungarian mathematicians
Academic staff of the University of Erlangen-Nuremberg
Academic staff of the Ludwig Maximilian University of Munich
TU Wien alumni
Topologists